Mono Masters is a compilation album by the Beatles, and is an alternate, all-mono version of the album Past Masters. Mono Masters was originally a two-CD set included as part of The Beatles in Mono box set. The premise of this box set was to compile only Beatles material which was released or prepared for release with a dedicated mono mix (the set excludes later material mixed and released only in stereo, and material whose mono version was simply created as an equal mix of the two channels of the stereo version, e.g. 1969's Yellow Submarine album). As a result, the track listing for Mono Masters differs from Past Masters on the second half of disc two, omitting some later songs that never had a mono mix ("Old Brown Shoe", "The Ballad of John and Yoko" and "Let It Be"), and adding several songs released on stereo-only albums that had unreleased mono mixes. Tracks 9–12 and 15 were prepared in March 1969 for release as a 7" mono Yellow Submarine EP, two months after the release of the similarly titled soundtrack album, but the project was scrapped, although the EP was mastered. Subsequently, the tracks were only released in stereo (and in an electronically produced mono mixdown, or "fold-down", of the stereo mix), while the true mono mixes remained unreleased. "Get Back" (with B-side "Don't Let Me Down") was the final Beatles single mixed for mono format. It was released in the UK in mono, though the US release was in stereo. Thus, the songs that were originally released on stereo singles in the UK are omitted on this release.

This compilation was released individually as a triple vinyl LP set on 9 September 2014 in Europe and the following day in North America on the same day that The Beatles in Mono box set was released in vinyl LP format. The vinyl format compilation is mastered directly from the original analogue mono master tapes.

Mono Masters track listing 
All songs written and composed by Lennon-McCartney, except where noted.

Disc one

Disc two

Mono Masters vinyl LP track listing 
All songs written and composed by Lennon-McCartney, except where noted.

Side one

Side two

Side three

Side four

Side five

Side six

References

2009 compilation albums
2014 compilation albums
Albums produced by George Martin
Albums recorded at Trident Studios
Apple Records compilation albums
The Beatles compilation albums
Capitol Records compilation albums
Compilation albums published posthumously
German-language compilation albums
Parlophone compilation albums
Albums recorded at Apple Studios